Punggawa is a title for a traditional local administrator, used in various parts of Indonesia. On Bali and by extension Lombok, the punggawa held the function of a hereditary vassal lord of a district, subservient to the raja. The term originally applied to the northern kingdom Buleleng, the southern district chiefs being known as manca or manca agung. With the Dutch conquest of Bali in 1906-1908, the term was applied by colonial administration to the entire island. On Sulawesi, too, the term was used for chiefs serving a major lord, in the form pongawa. In Javanese culture the punggawa is a court official in shadow plays (wayang).

References

Further reading
 Clifford Geertz, Negara; The Theatre State in Nineteenth-Century Bali. Princeton 1980.

History of Bali